Distichlis is a genus of American and Australian plants in the grass family. Plants in this genus are dioecious, have rhizomes or stolons, and have conspicuously distichous leaves.

Species
Species included in Distichlis include:
 Distichlis acerosa (Griseb.) H.L.Bell & Columbus – Argentina
 Distichlis australis (Speg.) Villamil – Argentina
 Distichlis bajaensis H.L.Bell – Mexico
 Distichlis distichophylla (Labill.) Fassett – Australia
 Distichlis eludens (Soderstr. & H.F.Decker) H.L.Bell & Columbus – Durango, Zacatecas, San Luis Potosí
 Distichlis humilis Phil. – Peru, Bolivia, Chile, Argentina
 Distichlis laxiflora Hack. – Argentina
 Distichlis littoralis (Engelm.) H.L.Bell & Columbus – California, Texas, Louisiana, Florida, Mexico, Bahamas, Cuba
 Distichlis palmeri (Vasey) Fassett ex I.M.Johnst. – Baja California, Sonora
 Distichlis scoparia (Kunth) Arechav. – Chile, Argentina, Uruguay
 Distichlis spicata (L.) Greene – from Newfoundland + Northwest Territories to Uruguay including Bahamas, Greater Antilles, Galápagos

Formerly included
Species formerly included in Distichlis include:
 Distichlis ammobia – Poa obvallata 
 Distichlis condensata – Eragrostis condensata 
 Distichlis multinervosa – Vaseyochloa multinervosa  
 Distichlis sudanensis – Aeluropus lagopoides  
 Distichlis texana – Allolepis texana  
 Distichlis volckmannii –  Poa cumingii

References

Chloridoideae
Grasses of North America
Grasses of Oceania
Grasses of South America
Poaceae genera
Taxa named by Constantine Samuel Rafinesque
Dioecious plants